Free zone may refer to:

Places and areas
 Free Zone (region), part of Western Sahara
 Zone libre ('free zone'), a partition of the French metropolitan territory during World War II
 Special economic zone
 Free economic zone, or free zone, or free port
 Free-trade zone

Other uses
 Free Zone (film), 2005 film
 Free Zone (Scientology), independent groups and individuals who practice Scientology beliefs

See also 

Free Territory (disambiguation)
 Azad Kashmir ('free Kashmir')
 Free area of the Republic of China
 "Free Xone", a song on Janet Jackson from the 1997 album The Velvet Rope
 No symbol